There are currently 30 National Parks of Costa Rica, which are managed under the umbrella of SINAC (Sistema Nacional de Areas de Conservacion), a department of Costa Rica's Ministry of Environment and Energy (MINAE). All told, Costa Rica's protected areas encompass more than 25% of the country's total land area. Many of these protected areas are national parks.

Costa Rica's progressive policies on environmental protection and sustainable ecotourism in the National Parks System have been lauded as a model for other countries. The rainforests, tropical forests, marine areas and wetlands of Costa Rica are the subject of many university and scientific organization studies. The enrichment of the world's knowledge of these important habitats is an invaluable contribution from the National Parks System of Costa Rica.

The Cordillera de Talamanca is home to an impressive collection of national parks and other preserved areas, including the La Amistad International Park, which extends into Panamá. On the southern Osa Peninsula is the internationally renowned Corcovado National Park, which preserves a remnant of sizeable lowland tropical rainforest that is unique in the world. Manuel Antonio National Park was listed by Forbes in 2011 among the world's 12 most beautiful national parks.

The Camino de Costa Rica is a 280 km long hiking trail across Costa Rica. It runs from the Atlantic Ocean (Caribbean coast), the southernmost part of the Tortuguero Canals, up the mountain and through indigenous territory near the Barbilla National Park and through valleys and mountain ranges of the central region of the country, just south of the Turrialba and Irazu Volcanos and through the Los Santos coffee region down to the Pacific coast in Quepos.

List of  National Parks of Costa Rica 
Arenal Volcano National Park
Barbilla National Park
Barra Honda National Park
Ballena Marine National Park
Braulio Carrillo National Park
Cahuita National Park
Carara National Park
Chirripó National Park
Cocos Island National Park
Corcovado National Park
Diriá National Park
Guanacaste National Park
Irazú Volcano National Park
Juan Castro Blanco National Park
La Amistad International Park
La Cangreja National Park
Las Baulas National Marine Park
Los Quetzales National Park
Manuel Antonio National Park
Miravalles Jorge Manuel Dengo National Park
Palo Verde National Park
Piedras Blancas National Park
Poás Volcano National Park
Rincón de la Vieja Volcano National Park
Santa Rosa National Park
San Lucas Island National Park
Tapantí National Park
Tenorio Volcano National Park
Tortuguero National Park
Turrialba Volcano National Park

See also 
 Conservation in Costa Rica

References 

Franke, Joseph (1993). "Costa Rica's National Parks and Preserves".

External links
 SINAC official site
 Costa Rica National Parks (English)
 Map and Introduction of Costa Rica National Parks
 National Parks of Costa Rica, Reserves and Protected areas
 National Parks of Costa Rica (audio-visual)

 
Costa Rica
National parks
National parks